Charles Avery Hickey (June 29, 1874 – March 4, 1929) was an American football coach.  He served as the third head football coach at Ohio State University, serving for one season in 1896 and compiling a record of 5–5–1. Hickey later worked as a lawyer.
He died of pneumonia in 1929. He was buried in Auburn, New York.

Head coaching record

References

1874 births
1929 deaths
Deaths from pneumonia in New York City
19th-century players of American football
Ohio State Buckeyes football coaches
Williams Ephs football players
Sportspeople from Auburn, New York